Kimono My House is the third studio album by American rock band Sparks, released on May 1, 1974, by Island Records. The album is considered to be their commercial breakthrough, and was met with widespread acclaim. 

Preceded by the single "This Town Ain't Big Enough for Both of Us", Kimono My House peaked at No. 4 in the UK and No. 101 in the US. Retrospectively, Kimono My House is considered one of Sparks's best works and one of the best glam rock albums.

History
In 1973, prior to the recording of the album, the brothers Ron and Russell Mael had accepted an offer to relocate to the United Kingdom in order to participate in the glam rock scene. The previous lineup consisting of Earle Mankey, James Mankey and Harley Feinstein was replaced with British musicians: Martin Gordon, Adrian Fisher and Norman "Dinky" Diamond joined the band to play bass, guitar and drums respectively. The group signed a record contract with Island Records and recorded Kimono My House in 1974. Although the Mael brothers had wanted Roy Wood to produce the album, he was unavailable, so Muff Winwood was hired instead. Winwood remained with the group to produce the follow-up album Propaganda later in 1974.

Title
The album's title is a line from the song on the album "Hasta Mañana, Monsieur", and a pun on the title of the song "Come On-a My House", made famous by Rosemary Clooney. The pun has a precedent, however, in the title of the track "Kimona My House" on jazz guitarist Dick Garcia's 1956 album A Message from Garcia.

Sound
Musically, Kimono My House represented a shift in sound and a focusing of Ron Mael's songwriting (now the indisputable lead songwriter). Sparks' two albums with the Mankey brothers had been diverse albums that featured a number of different styles, such as a cover of Rodgers and Hammerstein's "Do-Re-Mi", "Here Comes Bob", which was performed by a small string section, and "The Louvre", which mixed both English and French lyrics.

The new album embraced the more pop-oriented side of the Mael brothers' song-writing, which had previously been evident in songs such as "Wonder Girl" and "High C". Now, with challenging arrangements by the new British line-up and Winwood's simpler production, the songs were more focused. The album slotted in with the current popularity of glam rock—which was dominating the charts—in particular, the more experimental and electronic sound of Roxy Music and David Bowie. Lyrically, the songs remained unusual and humorous. The great number of words filled with pop-culture references, puns and peculiar sexual content, sung often in falsetto by Russell Mael, set Sparks apart from other groups.

The particularity of their sound, which matched pop songwriting with complex lyrics, defined the group to their UK audience. Integral to the sound was Adrian Fisher's guitar playing and Martin Gordon's sonorous Rickenbacker bass. The novel input of competent and innovative musicians constituted a successful formula which was maintained only until the tour which followed the release of Kimono My House, with Gordon fired before the tour and Fisher afterwards.

The other key component of the Sparks sound in this period was Ron Mael's keyboard. On the previous two albums Ron had primarily used a Wurlitzer electronic piano, but he found that the instrument did not stand up well to the rigours of touring, because the metal reeds that generated the notes frequently broke. When the group relocated to the UK, Mael purchased an RMI Electra-Piano model 300. This instrument had three basic sound options, a piano sound, an organ sound and a harpsichord sound, but Mael used only the piano sound for his work with Sparks.

Although the tonal quality was markedly inferior to a Wurlitzer or a Fender Rhodes – Mael later described the piano setting on the Electra-Piano as "incredibly terrible" – the RMI had several notable advantages for a touring musician. Unlike the electro-mechanical Wurlitzer and Rhodes, the RMI was a completely solid-state instrument, with each note generated by its own dedicated LC oscillator circuit, so it was both more robust and lighter than a Wurlitzer, and the tone generator circuits were very stable and did not drift out of tune, which was a common problem for many early electronic performance keyboards like the Minimoog synthesiser. To compensate for the very basic sound of the Electra-Piano, Mael fed the instrument through an Echoplex tape echo unit, giving it the highly distinctive "shimmer" that features prominently on their breakthrough single "This Town Ain't Big Enough for Both of Us". 
Ron Mael: "It was the first time I was really aware that technology can give some kind of mystery to the sound. There was a kind of haunting quality to the RMI with the Echoplex. Real tape delay gave it a little of a wobbly feel. That sound, these days, you can approximate it, but to get that thing, you need the old gear. I'm not a big collector of vintage gear, but I kept that Echoplex, 'cause it's just such a beautiful machine."

The visuals were aided and abetted by the physical presence of the group. Ron and Russell milked their peculiar image, with Ron's toothbrush moustache, reserved wardrobe and usually silent demeanour sat in diametrical opposition to his younger brother's long curly hair and energetic and flamboyant stage persona. Taken together, the sound and look of the group caused a sensation, producing what seemed to the mass audience to be an "overnight success".

What sounds like a honking saxophone line at the end of ”Equator”, is in fact a mellotron played by Ron Mael; the seductive whispers on the track are delivered by a sped-up Russell Mael.

Cover artwork
The original concept for the cover came from Ron Mael, who was inspired by a Japanese World War II propaganda photograph he had seen in an old wartime edition of Life magazine. The original image depicted two Japanese women in traditional dress disdainfully holding their noses with one hand while holding a photograph of British Prime Minister Winston Churchill. However, in place of the Churchill photo, Mael's homemade mockup substituted the cover of Sparks' previous album, A Woofer in Tweeter's Clothing (1973). 

The final version of the front cover was executed by the same team who created the classic early covers for Sparks' labelmates Roxy Music—Island Records Marketing Director Tim Clark, photographer Karl Stoecker and stylist Nicholas de Ville. It is notable for having neither the name of the band nor the album title on it. 

The two women pictured, in kimono, were actresses Michi Hirota and Kuniko Okamura. They were members of Japan's Red Buddha Theatre headed by Stomu Yamashta, which was performing in London at the time. Interviewed in 2014, Hirota recalled:

We were both actresses touring with a Japanese theatre company in Europe and the USA. My husband Joji Hirota was musical director. A record company (Island records) approached our director looking for Japanese women, and we were asked to do the modeling. I am the woman on the right (with a fan).

We were not told much, they just let us move freely. We didn't know how to arrange our hair properly or how to fix our kimono. There was nobody to dress us. The session took 4 or 5 hours. It had such an impact, however I thought that I looked bit ugly.

Asked if there were any other photos from the session, Hirota recalled:

Yes, I kept one Polaroid photo in which I looked rather kawaii (cute in Japanese), which Karl dropped on the floor. Hope this is OK with him. I keep it in my personal photo album.

In 1980, Michi Hirota (pictured right) would add vocals to David Bowie's "It's No Game".

The back cover includes the band name, the album title, list of songs and photos of the band members. The inner sleeve for the original vinyl record was printed with a full set of song lyrics on one side and a black and white photograph of the Mael brothers, framed in a spotlight, on the reverse.

Release
Kimono My House became a popular release, peaking at No. 4 on the UK Albums Chart, and was awarded gold status by the British Phonographic Industry (BPI) in September 1974. The single "This Town Ain't Big Enough for Both of Us" was a surprise hit and reached No. 2 on the UK Singles Chart, being certified silver in June 1974. It was held off the top spot by the Rubettes' bubblegum pop song "Sugar Baby Love", which remained at No. 1 for four weeks. Sparks' second Island era single, "Amateur Hour", reached the top ten in the UK later that summer.

Outside the UK, Kimono My House and its singles made a significant impact across Europe, notably in Germany, where both singles reached No. 12. In the US, the album reached No. 101 on the Billboard 200. The group's two Bearsville Records albums had garnered critical praise but few sales. The only significant chart performance had been for "Wonder Girl", which had been a minor regional hit and had crept into the lower reaches of the Cashbox chart at No. 92. In place of "Amateur Hour", "Talent Is an Asset" was selected as the album's second single in the US, and the album's third in New Zealand.

Critical reception and legacy

Upon its release, New Musical Express  published an enthusiastic one page review dubbing the album "an instant classic". Reviewer Ian Mac Donald wrote that all of the songs "sound like standards", adding "this record makes you jump in every sense" before concluding: "Kimono My House is the real breakthrough – I think you're gonna love it". Sounds praised the freshness of the material, saying, "the music is completely new and innovative". Reviewing Kimono My House for Rolling Stone in 1974, Gordon Fletcher was complimentary of Ron Mael's "whimsical" lyrics, which he felt revealed "a unique (if slightly warped) perspective and a volatile sense of humor", but found that they tended to be obscured by Winwood's "obfuscating" production. Fletcher further criticized Russell Mael's singing on the album as "a disappointing stab at intelligible vocals". The Spokesman Reviews critic wrote that it was "the most invigorating appealing" album "that I've heard in longer than I can recall at the moment". Reviewer Robert Hilburn wrote that the songs were "rich with vigor" with "great harmonies and dynamic tempo changes".

English singer and Smiths frontman Morrissey has frequently cited Kimono My House as one of his favorite albums and famously wrote a letter to the NME, at the age of 15, extolling its virtues. He later told the Mael brothers that it had been a key influence on him deciding to embark upon a music career. In 2010, Morrissey included it in a list of his 13 favorite albums of all time for The Quietus. Icelandic singer Björk has also named the album as one of her all-time favorites.  Steve Jones, guitarist and composer for the Sex Pistols, also hailed the album, recalling that in 1974, "The first Be-Bop Deluxe album, Axe Victim, and Sparks' Kimono My House were both big albums for me and Cookie [Paul Cook]. We'd sit in his bedroom for hours listening to them". John Frusciante of Red Hot Chili Peppers named Adrian Fisher's guitar playing on Kimono My House and its follow-up Propaganda as one of his influences for the album By the Way (2002). The album was featured in Robert Dimery's book 1001 Albums You Must Hear Before You Die. In 2020, the album was ranked at number 476 on Rolling Stones list of the 500 greatest albums of all time.

Re-release
Kimono My House was remastered and re-issued by Island in 1994 and 2006. The first issue by the Island Masters subsidiary added the non-album B-sides "Barbecutie" and "Lost and Found". The '21st Century Edition' added a live recording of "Amateur Hour" recorded by a subsequent (1975) line-up of the group and sleeve notes by Paul Lester, the deputy editor of Uncut.

A remastered 40th Anniversary Edition was released on December 15, 2014, on vinyl only, including previously unreleased demo material from the band's archives. Coinciding with the release the entire album was performed, along with the 35-piece Heritage Orchestra, at the Barbican Centre on December 19 and 20, where the band also performed brand new orchestral arrangements by Nathan Kelly. The programme also featured songs from their other 22 albums. The second date was added after the first night sold out.

As part of the live performance with the Heritage Orchestra, the band released the song "Thank God It’s Not Christmas" as a single. Stewart Mason of AllMusic said:
“One of the many highlights on the phenomenal Kimono My House, "Thank God It’s Not Christmas" is the archetypal song from Sparks’ Island Records era. Adrian Fisher’s lead guitar and Ron Mael’s piano duel insistently with a prominent string section, as Russell Mael sings an alternately wry and depressing lyric about the desire to find activities that distract oneself from a slowly disintegrating relationship. The lyrics are truly magnificent, both in their literal meaning and the way they work with the music, creating a rhythmic counter-melody that echoes Fisher’s guitar line, and Muff Winwood’s crystal-clear production emphasizes the song’s soaring, anthemic elements; although "Amateur Hour" and "This Town Ain’t Big Enough for Both of Us" were the hits and "Here In Heaven" is more beloved by fans, "Thank God It’s Not Christmas" is possibly the album’s highest point."

Track listing

Personnel
Credits are adapted from the Kimono My House liner notes.

Sparks
Russell Mael – vocals
Ron Mael – keyboards
Martin Gordon – bass
Adrian Fisher – guitar
Norman "Dinky" Diamond – drums, percussion, castanets

Production and artwork
Muff Winwood – producer
Richard Digby-Smith – recording engineer
Tony Platt – recording engineer
Bill Price – mixdown engineer
Nicholas de Ville – art direction, cover concept
Ron Mael – cover concept
Karl Stoeker – photography 
Bob Bowkett, CCS – artwork

Charts

Certifications

References

External links
The recording of Kimono My House
Kimono My House Review
Sparks – The "Kimono My House" album files
Sparks 'Kimono My House' fansite

1974 albums
Albums produced by Muff Winwood
Island Records albums
Sparks (band) albums
Avant-pop albums